The Hull-Ottawa Canadiens were a semi-professional ice hockey franchise from 1959 until 1963.

History

The Hull-Ottawa Canadiens were formed as members of the Eastern Professional Hockey League in 1959. The professional team was granted to the area after the success of a junior/senior mixed squad in the area called the Ottawa-Hull Canadiens, formerly the Montreal Junior Canadiens and junior farm team of the NHL's Montreal Canadiens, relocated to the capital region after the top tier of junior hockey dried up temporarily in Quebec.

With the EPHL entering the market, the Ottawa-Hull Canadiens were relocated by their parent, Montreal Canadiens, to Brockville, Ontario. The EPHL teams lasted for 4 years until the EPHL folded after the 1962-63 season.  In the Montreal Canadiens system, the EPHL Canadiens were able to draw up junior players from the Brockville team to fill their roster. The next season when the junior team moved to the Interprovincial Senior Hockey League and relocated to Hull, the EPHL Canadiens were able to draw both junior and senior players from their roster. The most notable being Jacques Laperriere.

Games were played at the Ottawa Auditorium and at the Arena de Hull later renamed the Arena Robert Guertin.

NHL alumni

Season records

See also
Ice hockey in Ottawa

External links
hockeydb.com Hull-Ottawa Canadiens (EPHL)

Defunct ice hockey teams in Canada
Ice hockey teams in Ontario
Ice hockey teams in Ottawa
Ice hockey in Gatineau
1959 establishments in Ontario
Ice hockey clubs established in 1959
1963 disestablishments in Ontario
Sports clubs disestablished in 1963